The Saint Louis Billikens men's basketball team is the intercollegiate men's basketball program representing Saint Louis University. They compete in the Atlantic 10 Conference. The head coaching position is currently held by Travis Ford. Chaifetz Arena is home to the Billikens. The Billikens have reached the championship game of the NIT tournament four times and have won it once (1948). They have appeared in the NCAA Division I men's basketball tournament ten times, most recently in 2019.

History

Rick Majerus era
On April 27, 2007, Rick Majerus accepted the head coaching position. His tenure at SLU got off to a rocky start; in their first conference game, the Billikens set an NCAA Division I record for fewest points scored in a game in the modern era of college basketball, losing 49–20 to George Washington.  However, as he had done previously at other programs, Majerus eventually made SLU a winning program.  In 2012, he led the Billikens to their first NCAA Tournament in 12 years, and their first appearance in a major poll in 17 years.

On August 24, 2012, Majerus announced he would not coach the 2012–13 season due to serious heart problems. Jim Crews, one of his assistants, took over for him on a temporary basis for that season. On November 16, it was announced that Majerus was retiring when it was apparent that his heart condition would not improve enough to allow him to return.

Majerus compiled a 95–69 (.579) record at St. Louis University and retired with an overall NCAA record of 517–215 (.706).

Jim Crews era
Jim Crews was promoted to head coach after serving on an interim basis following the health concerns and eventual death of Majerus. He was on Majerus' staff since 2011.  After leading the Billikens to a school-record 28 wins, Crews was formally named SLU's 25th head coach on April 12, 2013. He was fired after the 2016 Atlantic 10 tournament resulted in the elimination of the Billikens and marked the end of two 11–21 Billikens seasons. Crews was paid a $1.86 million buyout in 2016-17, according to tax forms.

Travis Ford era
On March 30, 2016, Saint Louis University announced that Travis Ford has been hired as the head basketball coach.  He inherited a Billikens team that had gone a disappointing 11–21 each of the previous two seasons under Jim Crews.   Due to a lack of talent from the previous regime, SLU was predicted to finish dead last of the Atlantic 10 conference during the 2016–17 season.  Basketball statistician Ken Pomeroy predicted the Billikens as the team most likely to go winless throughout its conference schedule.  Ford led the Billikens to six Atlantic 10 conference wins and a 12–21 overall record.

Postseason appearances

NCAA tournament results
The Billikens have appeared in ten NCAA Tournaments. Their combined record is 6–11.

NIT results
The Billikens have appeared in 20 National Invitation Tournaments (NIT). Their combined record is 18–19. They were NIT champions in 1948 and runner-up in 1961, 1989, and 1990.

CBI results
The Billikens have appeared in one College Basketball Invitational (CBI). Their record is 3–2 and they were the CBI runnerup in their only appearance.

Individual honors

Retired numbers

Honored jerseys 
Jerseys were honored/retired, but numbers remained active and can be chosen by future players

Home courts
1915, 1917 Muegge's Gymnasium (Grand Ave. and Hickory St.)
1919–1920 Rock Springs Turner Hall (Boyle Ave. and Chouteau Ave.)
1920–1921 College Hall
1921–1922 First Regiment Armory and Macabee's Hall (911 Vandeventer Ave.)
1922–1923 First Regiment Armory and Battery A Armory (1 game)
1923–1924 First Regiment Armory
1924–1925 SLUH Gymnasium
1925–1926 First Regiment Armory, SLUH Gymnasium and St. Louis Coliseum
1926–1945 St. Louis University Gymnasium (West Pine Gym)
1945–1968 Kiel Auditorium
1968–1973 St. Louis Arena
1973–1991 Kiel Auditorium
1991–1994 St. Louis Arena
1994–2008 Scottrade Center (Kiel Center, Savvis Center)
2008–present Chaifetz Arena

Billikens in the pros

H Waldman (born 1972), American-Israeli basketball player; Israeli Basketball Premier League

Career statistical leaders

Points
1) 1,972 – Anthony Bonner, 6' 8" F, 1986–1990
2) 1,910 – Erwin Claggett, 6' 1" G, 1991–1995
3) 1,880 – Roland Gray, 6' 5" F, 1985–1989
4) 1,877 – Monroe Douglass, 6' 4" G, 1985–1989
5) 1,703 – Scott Highmark, 6' 5" F, 1991–1995
6) 1,687 – Kevin Lisch, 6' 2" G, 2005–2009
7) 1,575 – Kwamain Mitchell, 5' 10" G, 2008–2013
8) 1,547 – Tommie Liddell III, 6' 4" G, 2005–2009
9) 1,499 – Dwayne Evans, 6' 6" F, 2010–2014
10) 1,491 – Harry Rogers, 6' 7" F, 1970–1973

Rebounds
1) 1,424 – Anthony Bonner, 6' 8" F, 1986–1990
2) 1,157 – Jerry Koch, 6' 4" F, 1952–1955
3) 1,128 – Jim McLaughlin, 6' 4" F, 1953–1956 
4) 998 – Jordan Goodwin, 6' 3" G, 2017–2021
5) 982 – Hasahn French, 6' 7" F, 2017–2021

Assists
1) 848 – Yuri Collins, 6' 0" G, 2019–Present
2) 436 – Josh Fisher, 6' 2" G, 2001–2004
3) 424 – Charles Newberry, 6' 3" G, 1987–1990
4) 422 – Jordair Jett, 6' 1" G, 2010–2014
5) 420 – Kwamain Mitchell, 5' 10" G, 2008–2013

Steals
1) 225 – Jordan Goodwin, 6' 3" G, 2017–2021
2) 192 – Anthony Bonner, 6' 8" F, 1986–1990
3) 179 – Josh Fisher, 6' 2" G, 2001–2004
4) 174 – Jordair Jett, 6' 1" G, 2010–2014
5) 172 – Kwamain Mitchell, 5' 10" G, 2008–2013

Blocks
1) 226 – Hasahn French, 6' 7" F, 2017–2021
2) 135 – Ian Vouyoukas, 6' 11" C, 2003–2007
3) 127 – Melvin Robinson, 7' 0" C, 1989–1992
4) 113 – Cory Remekun, 6' 9" F, 2009–2013
4) 113 – Willie Reed, 6' 11" F, 2008–2010

References

External links

 
 Saint Louis at Sports Reference